Ukrainians in Armenia are people of full or partial ethnic Ukrainian origin who live in Armenia.

Origins 
The first Ukrainians in Armenia came in the mid 19th century after the migration to Transcaucasia by “the Cossacks from Minor Russia” to seal the Empire’s southern borders. The main activity of the migrants was agriculture and livestock.

Statistics 
According to 2011 census there were 1176 Ukrainians in Armenia, 606 of whom reported Ukrainian as their mother tongue. Ukrainians are fifth-largest ethnic minority in Armenia.  According to election code of Armenia parliament seats are reserved four largest ethnic minorities.

According to 2001 census there were 1633 Ukrainians in Armenia.

According to 1989 census, there were 8.3 thousand Ukrainians in Armenia.

Notable Armenian Ukrainians
Roman Berezovsky, football coach, born in Yerevan
Yuriy Koval, football coach and former player, born in Dilijan

Ukrainian community organisations 
  Federation of Ukrainians of Armenia "Ukraine", which publishes a Ukrainian-Armenian language newspaper Dnipro-Slavutych.
 Vocal and dance ensembles: "Dnipro", "Dzvinochok", "Verbychenka", "Malyatko"
 "Ukraina" Benevolent Fund

See also  
 Armenia–Ukraine relations
 Ukrainian diaspora
 Census in Armenia
 Ethnic minorities in Armenia
 Demographics of Armenia
 Anatoly Zinevich
 Russians in Armenia

References 

Ethnic groups in Armenia
Armenia